Marco Arturo Marelli (born 21 August 1949) is a Swiss set designer and stage director who has worked at European opera houses for opera and ballet. He designed sets for ballets by John Neumeier, and for premieres of the operas Thomas Chatterton by Matthias Pintscher at the Semperoper in Dresden (1998) and Medea by Aribert Reimann at the Vienna State Opera (2010).

Career 
Born in Zurich on 21 August 1949, Marelli trained at the Kunstgewerbeschule Zürich to be a graphic designer. He assisted several set designers at the Wiener Volksoper and the Vienna State Opera, including Günther Schneider-Siemssen. August Everding engaged him in 1973 as an assistant of  the Staatsoper Hamburg. Marelli created there sets for the ballet company of John Neumeier.

From 1974, Marelli worked as a guest at the Theater Hagen, the Staatstheater Darmstadt, and at the Oper Frankfurt for stage directors Alfred Kirchner and Harry Kupfer. He also designed sets for the Komische Oper Berlin and the Theater am Goetheplatz in Bremen. From 1981, he also directed the operas for which he designed the set, beginning with Mozart's Die Zauberflöte at the Staatstheater Mainz. He was an Oberspielleiter at the Nationaltheater Mannheim in the 1984/85 season.

He has collaborated with his wife, the costume designer Dagmar Niefind, on productions at the Deutsche Oper Berlin, Paris Opéra, the Théâtre du Châtelet in Paris, the Liceu in Barcelona, the Finnish National Opera in Helsinki, the Houston Grand Opera, at the Royal Opera House in London, the Teatro Real in Madrid, in Strassburg, the Nationaloper in Tokyo and in Triest. They worked together for the premiere of Aribert Reimann's Medea at the Vienna State Opera in February 2010, conducted by Michael Boder.

Marelli was awarded a Danish Reumert Prize in 2009. He was made an honorary member of the Vienna State Opera in 2010.

Work 
Marelli created stage sets, and from the early 1981s also directed the following operas:

References

Literature 
  (ed.): Marco Arturo Marelli – Ich höre den Raum. Arbeiten für die Oper des Regisseurs und Bühnenbildners. Henschel Verlag, Leipzig 2010, .

External links 
 
  Operabase
 Marelli, Marco Arturo on Forumopera
 Marco Arturo Marelli on Operamusica
 Marco Arturo Marelli – Director on Artists Management Zürich

Swiss opera directors
Set designers
People from Zürich
1949 births
Living people